The 37th Academy Awards were held on April 5, 1965, to honor film achievements of 1964. The ceremony was produced by MGM's Joe Pasternak and hosted, for the 14th time, by Bob Hope.
 
The Best Picture winner, George Cukor's My Fair Lady, was an adaptation of a 1956 stage musical of the same name, which was itself based on George Bernard Shaw's Pygmalion, which had been nominated for Best Picture in 1938. Audrey Hepburn was controversially not nominated for Best Actress for her starring role as Eliza Doolittle; the unpopularity of her replacing Julie Andrews – who had originated the role on Broadway – as well as the revelation that the majority of her singing was dubbed by Marni Nixon (which wasn't approved by Hepburn herself) were seen as the main reasons for the snub.

The ceremony saw the first recipient of the Academy Award for Best Makeup and Hairstyling, William J. Tuttle for 7 Faces of Dr. Lao, albeit as an Honorary Award; it would not become a competitive category until 1981.

This year was the first in which three films received 10 or more nominations (repeated at the 50th and 92nd Academy Awards), and the only time in Oscar history that three films received 12 or more nominations: Becket and My Fair Lady each received 12, while Mary Poppins received 13.

Becket set an Oscars record with 11 losses (out of 12 nominations), later equalled by The Turning Point in 1977 (0 for 11), The Color Purple in 1985 (0 for 11), and The Power of the Dog in 2021 (1 for 12).

Awards

Nominations were announced on February 23, 1965. Winners are listed first and highlighted with boldface.

Academy Honorary Award
 William Tuttle "for his outstanding make-up achievement for 7 Faces of Dr. Lao."

Presenters and performers

The following individuals, listed in order of appearance, presented awards or performed musical numbers.

Presenters

Performers

Multiple nominations and awards

These films had multiple nominations:

 13 nominations: Mary Poppins
 12 nominations: Becket and My Fair Lady
 7 nominations: Hush...Hush, Sweet Charlotte and Zorba the Greek
 6 nominations: The Unsinkable Molly Brown
 4 nominations: Dr. Strangelove and The Night of the Iguana
 3 nominations: Father Goose
 2 nominations: The Americanization of Emily, A Hard Day's Night, Robin and the 7 Hoods, Seven Days in May and What a Way to Go!

The following films received multiple awards.

 8 wins: My Fair Lady
 5 wins: Mary Poppins
 3 wins: Zorba the Greek

See also 
22nd Golden Globe Awards
1964 in film
 7th Grammy Awards
 16th Primetime Emmy Awards
 17th Primetime Emmy Awards
 18th British Academy Film Awards
 19th Tony Awards

References

Academy Awards ceremonies
1964 film awards
1964 awards in the United States
1965 in California
1965 in American cinema
April 1965 events in the United States
Events in Santa Monica, California
20th century in Santa Monica, California